The 1940 NCAA Track and Field Championships was the 19th NCAA track and field championship.  The event was held at the University of Minnesota's Memorial Stadium in June 1940.  The University of Southern California won its sixth consecutive team title.

The meet took place during a two-day downpour that flooded the stadium and forced the field events to be moved indoors at the Minnesota field house.

Team result

Track events

100-yard dash 
 Barney Ewell, Penn State - 9.6 seconds
 Clyde Jeffrey, Stanford
 Bill Brown, LSU
 Harold Stickel, Pitt
 Leo Tarrant, Alabama State

120-yard high hurdles
 Ed Dugger, Tufts - 13.9 seconds (NCAA record, tied American record)
 Fred Wolcott, Rice
 Boyce Gatewood, Texas
 Frank Fuller, Virginia
 Jim McGoldrick, Washington

220-yard dash
 Barney Ewell, Penn State - 21.1 seconds (American record)
 Billy Brown, LSU
 Mickey Anderson, USC
 Leo Tarrant, Alabama State
 George Koettel, Oklahoma

220-yard low hurdles
 Fred Wolcott, Rice - 23.1 seconds
 Ed Dugger, Tufts
 Boyce Gatewood, Texas
 Jim Buck, Oregon
 Harold Stickel, Pitt

440-yard dash
 Lee Orr, Washington State - 47.3 seconds
 Gene Littler, Nebraska
 Howard Upton, USC
 Warren Breidenbach, Michigan
 Fred Alliniece, Prairie View Texas State

880-yard run
 Campbell Kane, Indiana - 1:51.5
  Ed Burrowes, Princeton
 Paul Moore, Stanford
 James Kehoe, Maryland
 Denzil Wiedil, California

One-mile run
 John Munski, Missouri
 Leslie MacMitchell, NYU
 Lou Zamperini, USC
 Mason Chronister, Maryland
 Max Lenover, Loyola of Chicago

Two-mile run
 Roy Fehr, Michigan State - 9 minutes, 18.9 seconds
 Dixon Garner, Washington State
 Ralph Scwarzkopf, Michigan
 Tom Quinn, Michigan Normal
 Ray Harris, Kansas

Field events

Long jump
1. Jackie Robinson, UCLA - 24 feet,  inches
2. Billy Brown, LSU
3. Welles Hodgson, Minnesota
4. Pat Turner, UCLA
5. William Lacefield, UCLA

High jump
1. Don Canham, Michigan - 6 feet,  inches
1. John Wilson, USC - 6 feet,  inches
3. Alfred Flechner, Idaho
4. Don Boydston, Oklahoma A&M
4. Joshua Williamson, Xavier of New Orleans
4. Russell Wulff, Stanford

Pole vault
1. Kenny Dills, USC - 13 feet, 10 inches
2. Quinn Smith, California
3. George Hoffman, Fresno State
4. Ralph Ross, Army
5. William Williams, Wisconsin

Discus throw 
1. Archie Harris, Indiana - 162 feet,  inches
2. Jack Hughes, Texas - 161 feet, 6 inches
3. Al Blozis, Georgetown - 161 feet, 5 inches
4. A. Cornet, Stanford
5. Edsel Wibbels, Nebraska

Javelin
1. Martin Biles, California - 204 feet, 10 inches
2. Herbert Grote, Nebraska
3. Boyd Brown, Oregon
4. Nick Vukmanic, Penn State
5. Clarence Gehrke, Utah

Shot put
1. Al Blozis, Georgetown - 56 feet, 1/2 inch 
2. Stan Anderson, Stanford
3. Herb Michael, California
4. Don McNeil, USC
5. John Mazyk, Pitt

See also
 NCAA Men's Outdoor Track and Field Championship
 1939 NCAA Men's Cross Country Championships

References

NCAA Men's Outdoor Track and Field Championship